Vlasenko (also spelled Vlassenko; Vlasenco;) is a common Ukrainian and Russian surname. The name may refer to several people:

Ilya Arkhipovich Vlasenko (1902-1963), Hero of the Soviet Union (1943)
Lev Vlassenko (1928—1996), Russian pianist and teacher
Natasha Vlassenko (born 1956), Russian-Australian pianist and teacher
Maryna Vlasenko (born 1987), Ukrainian handballer
Serhiy Vlasenko (born 1967), Ukrainian lawyer and politician
Vladyslav Vlasenko (born 1990), Ukrainian footballer

See also
 
 

Ukrainian-language surnames
Russian-language surnames